Laura Royo Sanjuán (born 9 February 1999) is a Spanish footballer who plays as a forward for Villarreal.

Club career
Royo started her career at Calanda.

References

External links
Profile at La Liga

1999 births
Living people
Women's association football forwards
Spanish women's footballers
Sportspeople from the Province of Teruel
Footballers from Aragon
Zaragoza CFF players
Villarreal CF (women) players
Primera División (women) players
Segunda Federación (women) players